The State Bank of Pakistan Sports Complex is a sports complex located in North Nazimabad, Karachi, Pakistan.

History
It was established in 2009.

The first recorded match on the ground was in the 2011/12 season. The ground hosted two first-class matches in the 2016/17 cricket season. It was selected as a venue to host matches in the knockout stage of the 2016–17 Quaid-e-Azam Trophy. In September 2019, the Pakistan Cricket Board named it as one of the venues to host matches in the 2019–20 Quaid-e-Azam Trophy.

See also
 List of cricket grounds in Pakistan

References

External links
State Bank of Pakistan Sports Complex at CricketArchive

State Bank of Pakistan
Cricket grounds in Pakistan
2011 establishments in Pakistan
Stadiums in Karachi
Sports complexes